Gorenje Podpoljane is a small settlement in the Municipality of Ribnica in southern Slovenia. It lies just west of the main road from Velike Lašče to Ribnica and the railway line from Ljubljana to Kočevje. The area is part of the traditional region of Lower Carniola and is now included in the Southeast Slovenia Statistical Region.

References

External links
Gorenje Podpoljane on Geopedia

Populated places in the Municipality of Ribnica